Diospyros dictyoneura is a tree in the family Ebenaceae. The specific epithet  is from the Greek meaning "net of nerves", referring to the leaf veins. Habitat is lowland mixed dipterocarp forests. D. dictyoneura is found from Indochina to west Malesia. In order to grow, the diospyros dictyoneura requires access to the sun. Its leaves are deciduous, and it attracts bees and birds.

Uses
Diospyros dictyoneura's fruits are edible to mammals and birds.

References

dictyoneura
Plants described in 1873
Trees of Myanmar
Trees of Thailand
Trees of Sumatra
Trees of Malaya
Trees of Borneo